The mitochondrial folate transporter (MTF) is a transport protein that facilitates the transfer of tetrahydrofolate across the inner mitochondrial membrane. It is encoded by the SLC25A32 gene and belongs to the mitochondrial carrier superfamily.

History 
The mitochondrial folate transporter was first described in 2000.

Role in pathology 
Mutations of the SLC25A32 gene cause the condition putatively called "riboflavin-responsive exercise intolerance" (RREI), also known as SLC25A32 deficiency. The first case report linking this condition to SLC25A32 was published in 2016. Several additional cases of SLC25A32 deficiency have been described since. The phenotype of the patients is reminiscent of multiple acyl-CoA dehydrogenase deficiency (MADD).

According to a review published in 2020, mutations of the SLC25A32 gene have been shown to cause neural tube defects in mice, and they have been associated with several human cases, based on a re-sequencing of DNA of patients with neural tube defects.

References

Mitochondrial proteins